Atlantic Wall is a 1970 French-Italian war-comedy film written  and directed by Marcel Camus and starring Bourvil and Peter McEnery. It was Bourvil's last film.

Plot 
The story is set during the Second World War, under the occupation of France, and shortly before the Battle of Normandy. Léon Duchemin is a peaceful restaurateur whose wife left him twenty years earlier. He lived in the company of his eccentric sister Maria, and his young adult daughter Juliette. His clients represent the whole of society in the village, ranging from Rommel's driver, to resistance fighters and black market traffickers.

One evening, during an air raid, Jeff, a British aviator whose plane was shot down, almost falls into Juliette's room. The next day, Leon hangs out with Charlus, the craftsman responsible for repainting his storefront. Leon is misidentified as the painter in question and is taken to the Kommandantur, where they have a similar job to offer him. Leon inadvertently carries a secret plan concerning the fortifications of the Atlantic Wall. Having made the acquaintance of Jeff who understands the interest of the discovery made by Leon, the latter is therefore obliged to join the French Resistance. The resistance takes the two men to England. Leon then finds himself in a British army training camp, under the orders of Jeff himself. He does not yet know that his daughter Juliette is pregnant and that the aviator will become his son-in-law.

Cast 
 Bourvil as Léon Duchemin 
 Peter McEnery  as  Jeff 
 Sophie Desmarets as   Maria Duchemin 
 Jean Poiret  as  Armand 
 Reinhardt Kolldehoff  as  Lt. Heinrich Jakobus Steinbichler aka  Totor 
 Sara Franchetti as   Juliette Duchemin 
 Pino Caruso as   Lt. Friedrich 
 Terry-Thomas  as   Comm. Perry 
 Jean-Pierre Zola as  Colonel Muller 
 Georges Staquet  as   Hippolyte 
  Jacques Préboist as   Ernest
 Johannes Eppler  as   Erwin Rommel
 Annabel Leventon as   Sybil
 Jackie Sardou as   Angèle Charlus  
 William Mervyn as Jeff's Father
 Jess Hahn  as   British Colonel  
 Patrick Préjean  as   British Officer  
  Michel Robin as The Shoemaker 
 Jacques Balutin  as   Gendarme 
 Norman Mitchell as First Cop
 Stephen Yardley as Second Cop

Reception
The film was the second most popular film in France in 1970, after The Gendarme Takes Off.

References

External links

French war comedy films
Italian war comedy films
1970s war comedy films
Films directed by Marcel Camus
1970 comedy films
1970 films
French World War II films
Italian World War II films
Films scored by Claude Bolling
Films set in France
Cultural depictions of Erwin Rommel
1970s French-language films
1970s French films
1970s Italian films